Maple Island is a small island in eastern Whitefish Bay of Lake Superior, located a few kilometres from Canada's shore between Goulais Bay and Batchawana Bay.

References

National Oceanic and Atmospheric Administration, National Ocean Service, Nautical Chart No. 14962, 18th Ed., 1990-04-07

External links
1831 Map showing Maple Island (top of map)

Landforms of Algoma District
Islands of Lake Superior in Ontario